Trager is a surname. People with the surname include:
 George L. Trager (1906–1992), American linguist
Hannah Trager (1870–1943), English writer and activist
Milton Trager, founder of Trager approach
Philip Trager (born 1935), American photographer
William Trager (1910–2005), American parasitologist

Fictional characters
Tig Trager in TV series Sons of Anarchy
Kyle Trager and others in TV series Kyle XY

See also
Trager approach, a form of somatic education
Trager Stadium, field hockey stadium at University of Louisville, USA
Traeger